Sing (means "Everybody") is a 2016 Hungarian short film directed and written by Kristóf Deák. Set in 1991, it follows the story of a girl who moves to a new elementary school and becomes a member of the award-winning school choir. In 2017, the film won the Oscar for Best Live Action Short Film at the 89th Academy Awards.

Plot
The story takes place in Budapest in 1991. Zsófi (Dorka Gáspárfalvi) moves to a new elementary school and becomes friends with Liza (Dorottya Hais). Zsófi joins the award-winning school choir but she is told not to sing out loud because Erika, the teacher, doesn't consider her good enough and the choir is preparing for a competition where they can win a trip to Sweden. Zsófi is visibly hurt, but she obeys the teacher and keeps her request secret from the other children.

Liza notices that Zsófi doesn't sing, and Zsófi tells her about the teacher's request. At the next choir rehearsal Liza confronts the teacher, but she is told that it's in the best interest of the choir that only the good singers sing out loud. Erika also tells Liza that she didn't want to publicly shame those who can't sing well, but now she asks all of them to raise their hands. Zsófi is surprised when she realizes that she was far from being the only one who wasn't allowed to sing. Later she tells Liza she has a plan.

The day of the competition arrives. Erika's choir is supposed to start singing, and all the children start silently mouthing the lyrics, no one sings. When a frustrated Erika leaves the stage, the children start to sing.

Cast
 Dorka Gáspárfalvi as Zsófi
 Dorottya Hais as Liza (singing voice: Rebeka Walton)
 Zsófia Szamosi as Ms Erika

The film features the choir of the Bakáts Square Musical Primary School from Budapest.

Production
The film's plot is based on a story that director Kristóf Deák heard from a Swedish friend. The first screenplay was written in 2012 with two English comedians Bex Harvey and Christian Azzola, and was originally set in an English-language environment instead of Hungary. In 2014 Deák rewrote the screenplay and received a funding of 8,000,000 forints from the National Media and Communications Authority (the highest amount that can be awarded for short and experimental films). An additional 2,000,000 forints came from the state, the filmmakers and the production company Meteor Filmstudio.

It was the first starring role for both Dorka Gáspárfalvi and Dorottya Hais, who were chosen from eighty children auditioning for the roles. The choir was chosen from among five school choirs.

The film was shot during six days; editing and post-production took a year to complete. The film was finished in Autumn 2015.

Awards and nominations
The film received the following awards and nominations:

Sing was selected as the opening film of the 14th Asiana International Short Film Festival in Seoul.

Notes 
1. Zsófia Szamosi received the award for her roles in Sing and Strangled (orig.: A martfűi rém).

References

External links
 
 

2016 television films
2016 films
2010s Hungarian-language films
2016 drama films
2016 short films
Films set in 1991
Films set in Budapest
Live Action Short Film Academy Award winners
Hungarian short films
Hungarian drama films